The 1973–74 ABA season was the seventh season of the American Basketball Association.  The New York Nets won the ABA championship, 4 games to 1 over the Utah Stars.

Only one franchise move occurred from the previous season, and it stayed in state.  The Dallas Chaparrals were purchased by Angelo Drossos and were moved to San Antonio and re-named the San Antonio Spurs.

Standings

Eastern Division

Western Division

Asterisk (*) denotes playoff team (the Conquistadors and the Rockets played a one game playoff to settle the tie for the final playoff spot, which the Conquistadors won)

Bold – ABA Champions

Playoffs

Awards and honors

 ABA Most Valuable Player Award: Julius Erving, New York Nets
 Rookie of the Year: Swen Nater, San Antonio Spurs
 Coach of the Year: Babe McCarthy, Kentucky Colonels & Joe Mullaney, Utah Stars  
 Playoffs MVP: Julius Erving, New York Nets
 All-Star Game MVP: Artis Gilmore, Kentucky Colonels
 Executive of the Year: Jack Ankerson, San Antonio Spurs
All-ABA First Team 
 Julius Erving, New York Nets (2nd First Team selection, 3rd overall selection)
 George McGinnis, Indiana Pacers (1st First Team selection, 2nd overall selection)
 Artis Gilmore, Kentucky Colonels (3rd selection)
 Jimmy Jones, Utah Stars (3rd selection)
 Mack Calvin, Carolina Cougars (2nd First Team selection, 3rd overall selection)
All-ABA Second Team
 Dan Issel, Kentucky Colonels (3rd Second Team selection, 4th overall selection)
 Willie Wise, Utah Stars (2nd selection)
 Swen Nater, San Antonio Spurs
 Ron Boone, Utah Stars
 Louie Dampier, Kentucky Colonels (4th selection)
All-Defensive Team
 Mike Gale (2nd selection), Kentucky Colonels 
 Artis Gilmore (2nd selection), Kentucky Colonels
 Julius Keye (2nd selection), Denver Rockets
 Ted McClain, Carolina Cougars
 Roland Taylor, Virginia Squires
 Willie Wise (2nd selection), Utah Stars
All-Rookie Team
Mike Green, Denver Rockets
Larry Kenon, New York Nets
Bo Lamar, San Diego Conquistadors
Swen Nater, Virginia Squires (traded to the San Antonio Spurs in November 1973)
John Williamson, New York Nets

References

 
ABA